Petter Thoresen may refer to:

 Petter Thoresen (ice hockey) (born 1961), Norwegian ice hockey coach and former player
 Petter Thoresen (orienteer) (born 1966), Norwegian orienteering competitor
 Petter Thoresen (badminton) (born 1955), Norwegian badminton player